A tennis tour (or tennis circuit) is tennis played in tournament format at a series of venues – a tour – over during a set period of weeks or months.  Professional tour tennis is played globally with one season consisting of one calendar year.  Several tournaments are held each week as players win prize money and earn ranking points.  A player's ranking determines her or his ability to enter a particular tournament, as tournaments vary in the amount money and points obtainable.  Winning a tournament typically requires winning four to six matches in succession, generally a match a day, as play is single-loss elimination.

Current professional tour tennis
Currently professional male tennis players compete in one of three tours, while there are two tours for female pro players.  The highest level of tour tennis is the ATP World Tour and the WTA Tour, for men and women respectively.  The ATP World Tour is integrated with the second tier ATP Challenger Tour and the third tier ITF Men's Circuit, as a single, unified global ranking system is kept, the ATP rankings.  For women, a player's results on both the WTA Tour and ITF Women's Circuit determine her WTA ranking.

Female players are free to play in events in either tour, although top-ranked players almost always play just in WTA Tour events.  In fact, they are obliged to appear in certain of the most prestigious tournaments and in a certain number of these during the year or face being penalized by the tour.  The same is true of male players.  For singles tennis, both men and women ranked outside of the world top 40 or so and inside the top 180 or so will compete in both the top and second tier tour events.  For male players, those ranked outside of the top 180 will then compete on both the ATP Challenger Tour and ITF Men's Circuit, while most players ranked outside the top 400 or so must compete on the ITF Men's Circuit.  (A few players, despite their ranking, have a certain personal stature that allows them to be granted wild cards into tournaments.  It may be that they were once ranked higher or have a certain level of fame, either globally or where the tournament is being held.)

A ranking cut-off is maintained that varies for each tournament - players ranked above the cut-off gain direct entry in that event's main draw while players ranked below it yet above a second cut-off gain entry into a qualifying tournament for the main draw.  In singles tennis, such a player typically needs to win two or three qualifying matches to qualify for entry into the main draw.  Matches are nearly always contested best two-of-three sets.  Tiebreaks are the norm in deciding sets level at six games apiece.  A typical tournament in any tier main draw for singles consists of 32 entrants, while the ATP 1000 events feature 58.  For doubles, generally 16 teams compete  and matches tied at one set each are settled by match tiebreaks.  A few tournaments, notably the season-ending championship, feature round-robin play where players play initially in a mini-league instead of in the typical single-loss elimination.  Generally in such events however, the final few rounds are still played in the typical knock-out format.

The ATP and WTA tours generally hold more than one tournament each week, while the ITF circuits, which oversees several events weekly, hold a few events during the month of December, the top tier tours' off-season.

Grand slam play
Grand slam tournament play is unique in that, for men, matches are best three of five sets, and that both female and male players do not play singles (or doubles) matches in consecutive days, barring inclement weather or other unforeseen scheduling issues.  The fields are expanded as one hundred twenty-eight singles players and 64 doubles teams are featured in the main draws.

Previous world tennis tours

Men's
Prior to 1990 professional men's tour tennis consisted of two competing tennis circuits, the Grand Prix tennis tour and World Championship Tennis.  This was particularly true during the 1970s, when tour tennis was started in its current format - previous to this, during the 1930s through to the 1960s, touring professional players tended to play exhibition matches instead of tournaments, as they were given appearance money instead of prize money.  This changed most significantly with the advent of open tennis, being in 1968.  By 1973, computer rankings were established for singles tennis. (Computer rankings for doubles tennis was begun in the early 1980s.)

By the 1980s, the Grand Prix tour was the main men's tennis tour, while WCT events were in certain years even part of the Grand Prix circuit.  In 1990, all top tier tour events became part of the ATP Tour as the Association of Tennis Professionals took control of professional tour tennis from the ITF's Men's Tennis Council.

Challenger tournaments were begun in 1978 and initially were separate events that did not comprise a unified tour.  At some point the ATP Challenger Series was formed, the precursor to today's ATP Challenger Tour.  Futures tennis tournaments were started by the ITF in the late 1990s.  Over time these one-week events replaced satellite tournaments, a  mini-circuit typically held over a four-week period at one location.  By 2007 satellite events were entirely phased out on the ITF Men's Circuit.

See also
List of tennis tournaments
Tennis Pro Tours